Kalman Gerencseri (born 9 January 1945) is a French former footballer who played as midfielder. He is the youngest player to play in the French first division, making his debut on 12 August 1960 at the age of 15 years, 7 months and 12 days. He also held the age record for the five top European leagues for over 60 years when in 2020 it was passed by Luka Romero.

References

1945 births
French footballers
French people of Hungarian descent
Association football midfielders
Ligue 1 players
Ligue 2 players
RC Lens players
AJ Auxerre players
Living people